Basilica College (RBC), founded in 1993, is a Catholic school in Ragama, Sri Lanka, managed by the Ragama Zonal Ediucation Office and is affiliated with the Religious of the Virgin Mary order. Basilica College is a mixed school and has classes from grade 6 to grade 13. Classes are conducted in Sinhala as well as English. The college houses is Gamunu, Vijaya, and Parakum. Old Basilicans Association start with about 15 members was inaugurated in 2015,

Houses 
The students are divided into Three houses:

Wijaya House
 Color : Red

Gamunu House
 Color : Orange

Parakum House
 Color : Green

Past principals of Basilica College 
 A.A. Silva (Founder)
 E.N.B.Silva
 M.K.L.M.L. Alwis

References

Educational institutions established in 1993
1993 establishments in Sri Lanka
Schools in Gampaha